Susan B. Hanley (born 1939) is an American academic, author, Japanologist and Professor Emerita of History at the University of Washington.

Career
Hanley was a Professor of Japanese Studies and History at the University of Washington. Her primary area of academic research and writing is the material culture of Tokugawa society.

The Journal of Japanese Studies was edited by Hanley for more than a quarter of a century.

Selected works
In a statistical overview derived from writings by and about Susan Hanley, OCLC/WorldCat encompasses roughly 10+ works in 20+ publications in 5 languages and 1,000+ library holdings.
 Economic and Demographic Change in Preindustrial Japan, 1600-1868 (1967)
 Population Trends and Economic Development in Tokugawa, Japan (1971)
 Population Trends and Economic Growth in Pre-Industrial Japan (1972)
 Toward an Analysis of Demographic and Economic Change in Tokugawa Japan : a Village Study (1972)
 Fertility, mortality and life expectancy in pre-modern Japan (1974)
 Economic and Demographic Change in Preindustrial Japan (1977)
 Family and population in East Asian History with Arthur P. Wolf (1985)
  (1994)
 Everyday Things in Premodern Japan the Hidden Legacy of Material Culture (1997)

Honors
 Association for Asian Studies, John Whitney Hall Book Prize, 1999.

References

Historians of Japan
American Japanologists
Living people
1939 births
University of Washington faculty